Baba Shemini (died 1831), known as Baba Shemimi of Fushë-Krujë or Baba Shemimi of Krujë was an Albanian Bektashi sheikh, bejtexhi, and martyr.

Baba Shemimi (or Shemim), whose full name was Kemaledin Shemimi Ibrahim, was initially a Sunni Muslim hodja and müderris (religious teacher). He got in touch with the Bektashi Sufi doctrine in the Köprülü tekke (today Veles, North Macedonia), together with his friend Hatemi Haidar Baba. He built the tekke of Fushë-Krujë on his return.
Baba Shemimi was a close acquaintance of Ali Pasha Tepelena, Vizier of the Janina Vilayet of the Ottoman Empire. He was the one who initiated Ali Pasha as a Bektashi. With the support of Ali, he built additional tekkes in Melçan, Xhefaji Baba tekke in Elbasan (Xhefaji Ibraim Babai was a dervish under Baba Shemin), Sadik Baba Tekke in Koshtan (near Memaliaj), etc. He is mentioned as highly mystical. He was also a Sufi poet, and his poetry was very direct with high notes of criticism toward public figures and social injustices of the time.
During his era, Baba Shemimi was the most famous Bektashi leader in Albania. The Dollma Tekke of Krujë had 360 holy tombs and was known as "the small Khorasan".
Baba Shemimi was assassinated in 1831, by the men of Kapllan Pasha Toptani from the most-powerful Ottoman Albanian family (Toptani) of the area. This is mentioned in the elegy that the bejte period poet Zenel Bastari wrote for him after his death. According to the Turkish scholar Sadettin Nüzhet Ergun, a letter sent from one of Shemimi's followers, and found in the Basri Baba library in Istanbul, describes that Baba Shemin was killed with two bullets in his chest, which reading the holy books. He was buried in his tekke.

See also
Nasibi Tahir Babai
Haxhi Ymer Kashari
Religion in Albania

References

18th-century Albanian people
19th-century Albanian people
1831 deaths
Albanian religious leaders
Albanian Sufi saints
Bektashi Order
Sufi poets
Assassinated Albanian people
Assassinated religious leaders
People murdered in the Ottoman Empire
Deaths by firearm in Albania
1831 murders in the Ottoman Empire